Bethel Baptist Church may refer to:

United Kingdom
 Bethel Chapel Guildford, Surrey
 Bethel Baptist Chapel, Llanelli, Carmarthenshire
 Bethel Strict Baptist Chapel, Robertsbridge, East Sussex

United States

 Bethel Baptist Church (Birmingham, Alabama), a U.S. National Historic Landmark in Alabama
 Bethel Baptist Church (Fairview, Kentucky), listed on the NRHP in Kentucky
 Bethel Baptist Church (Jennings, Louisiana)
 Mount Bethel Baptist Meetinghouse, listed on the NRHP in New Jersey
 Bethel Baptist Church (Pataskala, Ohio), listed on the NRHP in Ohio
 Bethel Baptist Church (Gresham, Oregon)
 Bethel Baptist Church (Sumter, South Carolina)
 Bethel Baptist Church (Houston, Texas), listed on the NRHP in Texas
 Bethel Baptist Church (Midlothian, Virginia), listed on the NRHP in Virginia
 Bethel Baptist Church (Fort Pierce, Florida)
 Bethel Church (Jacksonville, Florida), formerly the Bethel Baptist Institutional Church, listed on the NRHP in Florida
 Bethel Baptist Church (Marquette, Michigan )

See also
Bethel (disambiguation)
Bethel Church (disambiguation)
New Bethel Baptist Church (disambiguation)